Hotheads is the second album by Twin Cities-based alt-rock/world-music band Boiled in Lead. Like its predecessor BOiLeD iN lEaD, it is strongly centered on a blend of alt-rock and traditional Celtic folk, and has been called its "most roundly Celtic" album.

Style
The album consists largely of traditional folk songs, plus a cover of Ewan MacColl's "Go! Move! Shift! (The Moving-on Song)", but the band's raucous, garage-rock approach to the material displayed a cross-genre sensibility, interpolating country and rockabilly into the mix, that would develop even further on later albums. The shift in sound was partially a consequence of the band's evolving lineup. Fiddle player Dave Stenshoel had replaced the departed Brian Fox, and Todd Menton now joined Jane Dauphin on lead vocals and guitar.

Menton's style lent itself to both traditional takes on folk songs, as on "The House-Husband's Lament," and what Chuck Lipsig of Green Man Review called "a very loud, raucous, and sometimes incomprehensible punk version" of "The Gypsy Rover", which even featured the sound of a chainsaw. Bassist Drew Miller described Boiled in Lead's version as a conscious rejection of the folk-purist ethos: "We gave that song the beating it richly deserved, since it's such a hackneyed standard of the Irish pub circuit."

Hotheads and BOiLeD iN lEaD were later collected on 1991's Old Lead, with two previously unreleased tracks recorded during the Hotheads sessions.

In other media
Both Boiled in Lead and the Hotheads album appear in Emma Bull's 1987 urban fantasy novel War for the Oaks; the band itself has a cameo as the opening act for the protagonists' climactic performance at Minneapolis nightclub First Avenue, while the album appears during a quieter moment earlier in the book, when the main character plays the record while having a conversation.

Awards
The album won a Minnesota Music Award for Best Celtic/Bluegrass/Folk Album in 1987.

Track listing

Credits
Jane Dauphin: Guitar, vocals
Mitch Griffin: Drums and percussion (also synthesizer on "The Galtee Set", electric guitar and EFX on "Gypsy Rover", piano on "The Bank and Star", keyboards on "Jenny Pluck Pears")
Todd Menton: Guitar, vocals, tin whistle (also banjo on "French Tunes" and "Texas", saxophone on "Castle Kelly" and "Jenny Pluck Pears", celeste and keyboards on "Shamrock Shore", bodhran on "Preacher on a Pony")
Drew Miller: Bass guitar (also keyboards on "French Tunes", synthesizer on "Preacher on a Pony", recorders and bass synth on "Jenny Pluck Pears")
David Rockne Stenshoel: Fiddle, electric mandolin (also e-bow mandolin on "Shamrock Shore", wah-wah mandocaster on "Gypsy Rover", saxophone on "Jenny Pluck Pears")

Recorded August-October 1985 at Nicollet Studios, Minneapolis
Produced and mixed by Amos Box for The Crack
Engineered by Steve Fjelstad
Mastered by Larry Nix at Ardent Studios, Memphis
Art direction and illustration by Dan Picasso
Type by Luke at Great Faces, Inc.
Photo by Dan Corrigan
Cover mechanical by Chris Schmid

References

1987 albums
Boiled in Lead albums